= Thoudam Prabha Devi =

Thoudam Prabha Devi is the vice-chancellor of the Jayoti Vidyapeeth Women's University in Jaipur. She is the youngest women vice-chancellor in India.
